Sales Promotion magazine is a monthly UK business-to-business magazine for people working in marketing.

It was launched in 1989 by Brainstorm Publishing, based in Hertford. It was then purchased in 1991 by Marketlink Publishing, based in Bishops Stortford, Hertfordshire, and latterly Saffron Walden, Essex. It remained part of the company’s portfolio after it was acquired by Eastern Counties Newspaper Group (ECNG) in 1999 for £5 million. When ECNG became Archant in 2002, the division publishing Sales Promotion changed its name from Market Link to Archant Specialist.

Archant sold Sales Promotion magazine to Cambridgeshire-based Greenhill Publishing in 2005. The title was then bought by a newly formed company, Sales Promotion Publishing, in 2007. It is published in partnership with UK trade association, the Institute of Sales Promotion.

The magazine is currently published 11 times a year, distributed to a controlled circulation of 8,000 senior people working in marketing and sales, including marketing agencies. It covers marketing through all media channels including digital, direct mail and experiential marketing as well as staff and channel-partner motivation.

Editors of the magazine have included Paul Rowney (founder) Kathryn Dale, Clare Irvin, Janine Hill, Mandy Thatcher, Lisa Burn, Kathryn Roberts, Jerry Glenwright and Gill Crawley, Matt Sullivan, Mark Ludmon and Martin Croft. They have regularly worked with guest editors drawn from the marketing community.

References

External links
 www.salespromo.co.uk

1989 establishments in the United Kingdom
Business magazines published in the United Kingdom
Magazines established in 1989
Marketing journals
Mass media in Cambridgeshire
Mass media in Essex
Mass media in Hertfordshire
Monthly magazines published in the United Kingdom
Professional and trade magazines